Satyendra Kuckreja (born 28 October 1934) is an Indian former cricketer. He played first-class cricket for Bengal, Delhi and Jharkhand.

See also
 List of Bengal cricketers
 List of Delhi cricketers

References

External links
 

1934 births
Living people
Indian cricketers
Bengal cricketers
Delhi cricketers
Jharkhand cricketers
Cricketers from Delhi